Radiant is an anime series based on the manfra series of the same name written and illustrated by Tony Valente. The series is directed by Seiji Kishi and Daisei Fukuoka, and written by Makoto Uezu, with animation by studio Lerche. Character designs are produced by Nozomi Kawano, and Masato Koda is composing the series' music. The 21-episode anime series aired on NHK Educational TV from October 6, 2018, to February 23, 2019. It is based on volumes 1 through 4 of the manfra. The series is simulcast by Crunchyroll, with Funimation producing an English dub as it aired.

The series received a French dub which first aired on Game One in France on September 2, 2019.

Funimation's English dub of Radiant began airing on ABC Me in Australia starting on January 2, 2021.

The opening theme is "Utopia" by 04 Limited Sazabys, while the ending theme is "Radiant" by Polkadot Stingray.


Episode list

Notes

References

Radiant episode lists
2018 Japanese television seasons
2019 Japanese television seasons